AG12 may refer to:
Russian submarine AG-12
AG12 (battery)